The Tomb of Askia, in Gao, Mali, is believed to be the burial place of Askia Mohammad I, one of the Songhai Empire's most prolific emperors. It was built at the end of the fifteenth century and is designated as a UNESCO World Heritage Site.

UNESCO describes the tomb as a fine example of the monumental mud-building traditions of the West African Sahel.  The complex includes the pyramidal tomb, two mosques, a cemetery and an assembly ground.  At 17 metres in height it is the largest pre-colonial architectural monument in Gao.  It is a notable example of the Islamic architectural style that later spread throughout the region.

Relatively recent modifications to the site have included the expansion of the mosque buildings in the 1960s and mid-1970s, and the 1999 construction of a wall around the site. It has also been regularly replastered throughout its history, a process essential to the maintenance and repair of mud structures. Electricity was added in the early 2000s, allowing for ceiling fans, lights and a loudspeaker mounted on top.

Askia is in regular use as a mosque and a publicly owned cultural centre for the city of Gao.  The site and a buffer area around it are protected by both national and local laws.

History 
Askia Mohammed was the first Askia emperor and expanded the Songhai Empire. As a devoted Muslim, he felt obligated to make his pilgrimage to Mecca, which he returned from in 1495. He brought back with him the materials to make his tomb; all of the mud and wood came from Mecca. The caravan is said to have consisted of "thousands of camels." It was structured as a house, with several rooms and passageways and was sealed when Askia Mohammed died.

Although Askia Mohammed is the only one that was buried in the tomb itself, several other Askia's are buried in the courtyard.

Gallery

References

External links 

World Heritage Website
UNESCO Evaluation of Askia (in English and French)

Buildings and structures completed in the 15th century
World Heritage Sites in Mali
Sudano-Sahelian architecture
Gao Region
World Heritage Sites in Danger
Mosques in Mali
Monuments and memorials in Mali